Pierre Alonzo (born 23 March 1940) is a French former footballer who played as a midfielder for Aïn-Temouchent, Avellaneda, Perpignan, Red Star, Cannes and Rapid de Menton.

He coached Saint-Tropez, Paris Saint-Germain, Bordeaux, Périgueux and Nice.

His son is goalkeeper Jérôme Alonzo.

References

External links
 Player profile

1940 births
Living people
People from Meknes
Association football midfielders
French footballers
Moroccan emigrants to France
Red Star F.C. players
AS Cannes players
French football managers
Paris Saint-Germain F.C. managers
OGC Nice managers
French people of Spanish descent